Pollution is the second studio album by the Italian progressive rock musician Franco Battiato. It was released in 1973 on the experimental label Bla Bla (catalogue no. BBXL10002). It reached No.19 in the Italian Album charts.

Track listing
 "Il silenzio del rumore" (2:48)
 "31 Dicembre 1999 - Ore 9" (0:20)
 "Areknames" (5:07)
 "Beta" (7:25)
 "Plancton" (5:03)
 "Pollution" (8:49)
 "Ti sei mai chiesto quale funzione hai?" (3:35)

Personnel
 Franco Battiato - vocals, VCS 3 synthesizer
 Ruby Cacciapaglia - piano, VCS 3 and VCS 2 synthesizer
 Gianfranco D'Adda - drums
 Mario Ellepi - guitars, VCS 3 synthesizer, vocals
 Gianni Mocchetti - bass, VCS 3 synthesizer, vocals

References

External links
 Swan Fungus » Franco Battiato – Pollution

1972 albums
Franco Battiato albums
Italian-language albums